Toynbee School is an 11-16 (no sixth form) secondary school in Chandler's Ford, Hampshire. The head teacher is Matthew Longden.

History
Toynbee School was first formed in 1929 when it was called the 'Eastleigh Boys Senior School' and was based on Derby Road. In 1932 the school was moved to newer, more modern buildings on Leigh Road and became known as Toynbee Road Secondary Boys School. In 1964 the school moved again and became co-educational with the Chamberlayne Road Girls School. The school first became known as Toynbee School when it moved to the North End buildings on Leigh Road. Toynbee School became a comprehensive school after this move. Toynbee School moved to its present site on Bodycoats Road, Chandler's Ford in 1977.

Curriculum
Toynbee School's curriculum is "broad and balanced" according to the school so as to provide the framework for pupils to have the "skills, knowledge, attitudes and values which will help them play a full and useful role in all aspects of adult society." Toynbee School has a school day shorter than the national average.

Some pupils with learning difficulties receive special educational support. The school also benefits from having the ‘Toynbee Resource for Pupils with Visual Impairment’. This department specialises in supporting visually impaired pupils whilst helping them to
maintain their independence.

Facilities
Toynbee School has science laboratories, language rooms, maths rooms, English rooms, two ICT suites with broadband internet access, design technology rooms, art rooms, a theatre and dance studio, music rooms with practice areas and a large sports hall with changing and storage facilities. There are also tennis courts, a sports field and hard court facilities. There is also a Learning Resource Centre staffed by a full-time librarian.

References

Secondary schools in Hampshire
Educational institutions established in 1929
1929 establishments in England
Community schools in Hampshire